The 1921 Yale Bulldogs football team represented Yale University in the 1921 college football season. The Bulldogs finished with an  8–1 record under fourth-year head coach Tad Jones.  Yale outscored its opponents by a combined score of 202 to 31. Its sole loss came in the final game of the season, a 10–3 loss against Harvard at Cambridge, Massachusetts. Yale halfback Malcolm Aldrich was a consensus selection for the 1921 College Football All-America Team, receiving first-team honors from Walter Camp, Billy Evans, Walter Eckersall, Jack Veiock, Malcolm McLean, and Norman E. Brown.

Schedule

References

Yale
Yale Bulldogs football seasons
Yale Bulldogs football